De Ferrari is a Genoa Metro station, located in Piazza De Ferrari in the centre of Genoa, Italy. The station is close to Teatro Carlo Felice, Galleria Mazzini, the Doge's Palace, and Via XX Settembre.

The station opened on 4 February 2005. It was originally designed, like others, by Renzo Piano with finishing touches by Renzo Truffelli. This used to be the last station on the line until the easterly extension  towards Genova Brignole railway station opened in 2012.

References

External links

Genoa Metro stations
Railway stations opened in 2005
2005 establishments in Italy
Renzo Piano buildings
Railway stations in Italy opened in the 21st century